Man from Cheyenne  is a 1942 American Western film directed by Joseph Kane and starring Roy Rogers.

Cast

 Roy Rogers as himself
 George "Gabby" Hayes as Gabby Whittaker
 Sally Payne as Sally Whittaker
 Lynne Carver as Marian Hardy
 William Haade as Ed
 James Seay as Jim
 Gale Storm as Judy Evans
 Jack Ingram as Jack
 Fred Burns as Harry 
 Al Taylor as Ranchhand
 Ken Cooper as Bill
 Ivan Miller as Edwards
 Frank Brownlee as Old duffer
 Monte Montague as Harvey
 Guy Usher as Hendricks
 Jack Rockwell as Brenner
 Lynton Brent as Clerk
 Eddie Lee as Chinese cook
 Dorothy Christy
 Trigger as himself
 The Sons of the Pioneers:
 Bob Nolan
 Tim Spencer
 Roy Rogers Riders
 Pat Brady
 Karl Farr
 Hugh Farr
 Lloyd Perryman

Home media
On August 25, 2009, Alpha Video released Man from Cheyenne on Region 0 DVD.

References

External links
 

1942 films
Republic Pictures films
1942 Western (genre) films
American Western (genre) films
American black-and-white films
Films directed by Joseph Kane
1940s English-language films
1940s American films